A working paper or work paper may be: 

A working paper  or technical paper.  Often, authors will release working papers to share ideas about a topic or to elicit feedback before submitting to a peer reviewed conference or academic journal.  Working papers are often the basis for related works, and may in themselves be cited by peer-review papers. They may be considered as grey literature. 
 Sometimes the term working paper is used synonymously as technical report.  Working papers are typically hosted on websites, belonging either to the author or the author's affiliated institution. The United Nations uses the term "working paper" in approximately this sense for the draft of a resolution.
Documents required for a minor to get a job in certain states within the United States. Such papers usually require the employer, parent/guardian, school, and a physician to agree to the terms of work laid out by the employer. 
 Audit working papers: Documents required on an audit of a company's financial statements. The working papers are the property of the accounting firm conducting the audit. These papers are formally referred to as audit documentation or sometimes as the audit file. The documents serve as proof of audit procedures performed, evidence obtained and the conclusion or opinion the auditor reached.

See also
 Preprint
 Grey literature
 Living document

Scientific documents

Publications by format
Grey literature